Ottawa National Wildlife Refuge is a National Wildlife Refuge of the United States, which is located in the state of Ohio. This refuge was established in 1961, under the Migratory Bird Conservation Act, the purpose of the refuge being created was “… for use as an inviolate sanctuary, or for any other management purpose, for migratory birds.” 16 U.S.C. 715d. This refuge provides ideal habitat for a wide range for migratory birds and waterfowl, along with the native wildlife, and any endangered and threatened species. The property of the refuge was purchased from hunt clubs and farmlands with the Federal Duck Stamps.

This region has historically been important to fish, migratory waterfowl, songbirds, and shorebirds. Large numbers of migrating songbirds stop in the area to rest during their spring migration. The refuge is an attraction for birdwatching enthusiasts. Ottawa has the ideal habitat for birds that are coming through the area during migration season. Which makes it a great place for those who enjoy birdwatching it is also a great place for birdwatching even when not during migration season. It is also home to several bald eagles. This wildlife refuge has been designated as a site of regional significance in the Western Hemisphere Shorebird Reserve Network. In 2002, Birder's World readers voted the refuge as one of their Top 15 favorite spots to see birds, and the American Bird Conservancy has identified the refuge as an Important Bird Area.

Background

The purchasing of the land was authorized through the Migratory Bird Conservation and the Hunting Stamp Act (also known as the Duck Stamp Act). Along with managing Ottawa, but they also manage two other sites, Cedar Point and West Sister Island refuges. The three refuges together bring to a total over  that the staff manages. The three refuges help protect some of what is left of the Great Black Swamp which is in the heart of Lake Eire marshes.

Exploring Ottawa
There are many ways to exploring Ottawa National Wildlife Refuge, whether it be hiking on the dikes, which help maintain the water levels in the pools, going on the Wildlife Drive, or going on a Tram Tour that is provided by the Ottawa visitor center.

References

External links
 Ottawa National Wildlife Refuge

Protected areas of Lucas County, Ohio
National Wildlife Refuges in Ohio
Protected areas of Ottawa County, Ohio
Protected areas established in 1961
Wetlands of Ohio
Landforms of Ottawa County, Ohio
1961 establishments in Ohio